Leif Bloms was a dansband in Växjö in Sweden. scoring chart successes at the Swedish album chart during the mid-late 1970s. On 31 December 1995 the band was disbanded after singing and playing together for almost 40 years. Starting with the 1981 album Håll dig kvar, the band's singer was Mona Gustafsson, who wrote the band's 1992 song "Dej ska jag älska all min tid" which won the 1992 Hänt song contest in Älvsjö. After the band was disbanded, Mona Gustafsson, Patrik Ahlm and René Saulesco founded another dansband, Mona G:s orkester.

Members

From start
Åke Blom - guitar
Leif Blom - keyboard
Simon Blom - bass

Later members
Gert Blom - trumpet, guitar, keyboard
Mona Gustafsson - vocals (1981-1995)
Svend Erik Hansèn - bass
Peo Henriksson - bass, vocals
Peter Heigis - drums
Madeleine Käll - vocals
Kenneth Karlsson - drums
C A Olsson - drums
Egon Olsson - drums
Ingrid Jones - vocals
Lisbeth Magnusson - vocals
Ulf Lindstrand - drums, vocals
Carina Jönsson - vocals
Olle Hallstedt - drums, vocals
Stefan Svensson - bass
Renè Saulesco - drums, violin, vocals
Patrik Ahlm - bass, vocals

Discography

Album
Leif Bloms orkester - 1973
På världens tak - 1974
Vilken härlig fest - 1975
Här igen - 1976
Hem till dej - 1977
Amore - 1977
En souvenir - 1977
Vem får din sång - 1979
Cindy - 1979
Jul för dig och mig - 1980
Håll dig kvar - 1981
Jubileumsalbum - 1983
Som en saga - 1984
Alltid på väg - 1986
Härligt ljusblåa ögon - 1988
Bara för en stund (samling) - 1988
Årets skiftningar - 1990
Vilken underbar värld: 12 instrumentala önskemelodier - 1992
Dej ska jag älska all min tid - 1993
Det bästa som hänt (samling) - 1993
En ring av guld (samling) - 1994
Leif Bloms 20 bästa (samling) - 1997
Nu och för alltid (samling) - 2008

Singles
En liten gnista/Min lyckostjärna - 1968
Lat oss slå på stora trumman/Nei jag kandig ej förlåta - 1968
Om sanningen ska fram/Låt oss möta sommaren - 1968
Det var du som stal mitt hjärta Carl Johan/Vill du vinna mig tillbaka - 1969
Snart är våren här/Ta mej hem till din mamma - 1970
Ticke ticke tong/Vilken underbar dag i dag - 1971
Då föddes kärleken/Trumpetens sång - 1971
Alla har vi våra drömmar/Klockornas sång - 1972
Gotländsk sommarnatt/En tidlös dröm - 1974
Vi ha glädjen tillsammans/Petter och Frida - 1974
En gunga för två/En sommarnatt - 1975
Vilken härlig fest/Säg fröken får jag en dans - 1975
Du dansar verkligt bra/När sommaren kommer - 1976
Vid mitt fönster/Angelique - 1977
Vem får din sång/Substitud - 1978
Oh Susie bara vi två vet/Yours - 1979
Släng dej i väggen/Om du stannar kvar - 1988
Ännu en gång/Finns det tro finns det hopp - 1991
Jag vill ha dej för mig själv/En enda vår - 1990 
Jag sjunger för dej/När jag kysste lärar'n - 1991
Stopp stanna upp/Tid att förstå - 1991
Dej ska jag älska all min tid/Öppna ett fönster/Ensam med dig - 1992
Det bästa som hänt/Det finns ingenting att hämta/Om du ser i mina ögon - 1993
En ring av guld/Om du ser i mina ögon - 1994

Melodier på Svensktoppen
Då föddes kärleken - 1971 (with Gert Blom)
Jag ska ta morfar med mig ut i kväll - 1977
Nu och för alltid - 1993
Det bästa som har hänt - 1993
En ring av guld - 1994

References 

1995 disestablishments in Sweden
1956 establishments in Sweden
Dansbands
Musical groups disestablished in 1995
Musical groups established in 1956
Växjö